Pedro Moreira may refer to:
Pedro Moreira (footballer, born 1983), Portuguese football defender
Pedro Moreira (born 1983), Cape Verdean football forward
Pedro Moreira (footballer, born 1989), Portuguese football midfielder